Alex Howes (born January 1, 1988) is an American former professional road racing cyclist, who competed as a professional in 2007 and from 2012 to 2022, spending his entire career with . Howes turned professional on a full-time basis in 2012.

Personal life

Howes was born on January 1, 1988, in Denver, Colorado and raised in Golden, Colorado, United States. He resides in Boulder, Colorado and Girona, Catalonia, Spain. Howes attended the University of Colorado, Boulder.

Cycling career

Garmin–Barracuda (2012–2022) 
He remained with the team for the 2014 season. Howes won stage seven of the 2014 USA Pro Cycling Challenge; his first professional victory.

He was named in the start list for the 2017 Giro d'Italia.

Major results

2009
 National Under-23 Road Championships
1st  Criterium
1st  Road race
 4th Overall Tour of Utah
1st  Young rider classification
1st  Mountains classification
1st Stage 4
 5th Mount Evans Hill Climb
2010
 2nd Road race, National Under-23 Road Championships
 7th Tour of the Battenkill
2011
 4th Overall Tour of the Gila
 4th Overall Tour de Beauce
2012
 1st Stage 2 (TTT) Tour of Utah
 6th Brabantse Pijl
2014
 1st Stage 7 USA Pro Cycling Challenge
 3rd Road race, National Road Championships
2015
 4th Road race, National Road Championships
2016
 2nd Road race, National Road Championships
 9th Overall Tour of Alberta
2017
 1st  Mountains classification, Tour of the Basque Country
 Cascade Cycling Classic
1st Stages 1 & 5
 3rd Overall Colorado Classic
1st Stage 2
 3rd Overall Tour of Alberta
1st Stage 3
2019
 1st  Road race, National Road Championships
 1st Stage 1 (TTT) Tour Colombia
 3rd Dirty Kanza 200
 3rd Crusher in the Tushar
 5th Leadville Trail 100 MTB
2021
 1st SBT GRVL

Grand Tour general classification results timeline

References

External links

1988 births
Living people
American male cyclists
People from Golden, Colorado
Cyclists from Colorado
University of Colorado alumni